Chemical game theory is an alternative model of game theory that represents and solves problems in strategic interactions, or contested human decision making. Differences with traditional game theory concepts include the use of metaphorical molecules called “knowlecules”, which represent choices and decisions among players in the game. Using knowlecules, entropic choices and the effects of preexisting biases are taken into consideration. A game in chemical game theory is then represented in the form of a process flow diagram consisting of unit operations.  The unit operations represent the decision-making processes of the players, and have similarities to the garbage can model of political science.

A game of N players, N being any integer greater than 1, is represented by N reactors in parallel. The concentrations that enter a reactor corresponds to the bias that a player enters the game with. The reactions occurring in the reactors are comparable to the decision making process of each player. The concentrations of the final products represent the likelihood of each outcome given the preexisting biases and pains for the situation.

References

Game theory